Outlaws is an American science fiction western television series which aired Saturday nights on CBS from December 28, 1986 until May 30, 1987. The original series began as a 2-hour pilot movie, and was followed by eleven one-hour episodes.

Plot 
The story begins in Houston, Texas in 1899, as Sheriff Jonathan Grail tried to round up the villainous four-man Pike Gang, of which he had once been a member.  After cornering the gang in a stormy Native American graveyard, a bolt of lightning struck all five men - transporting them 87 years forward in time to 1986.  With no way to get back to their original time, the five men agreed to a truce, and started a private investigation/detective agency to pay their bills.

The five men, now working as the "Double Eagle Detection Agency," helped right wrongs, protected the downtrodden, and fought off drug lords and gang leaders, all while continuing to operate with 19th-century weaponry, including revolvers and shotguns.  Several of the episodes dealt with problems the men faced in the 1880s that had to be resolved in the 1980s. No one knew their real identities, and most people assumed that their old-style clothing and weapons were an affectation. During their first case they met Lt. Maggie Randall, a Houston detective, who became romantically involved with Grail and often helped them in their cases.

The series featured crime drama and shootouts, although the heroes never killed anyone, thanks to their superior marksmanship. The show also featured humorous moments. The humor derived primarily from the outlaws' unfamiliarity with 20th-century technology, as well as the contrast between their 19th-century mores and those of the 20th century. Most episodes featured flashbacks, which were done in a sepia tone.

Although the pilot episode was one of the most-watched shows that week, future episodes drew fewer and fewer fans.  The series' final episode, in fact, featured a "flashback" scene from another television show, The Oregon Trail, in which Outlaws actors Rod Taylor and Charles Napier both starred.

Characters

Episodes

Low ratings and cancellation
Outlaws was considered a "high concept" series, mixing three separate genres - time travel, the Western, and a detective series.  After very high ratings for the series pilot, Outlaws aired its regular episodes on Saturday nights, where it struggled to find an audience. It was cancelled in May 1987.

References

External links 
 

1986 American television series debuts
1987 American television series endings
1980s American drama television series
English-language television shows
1980s Western (genre) television series
CBS original programming
Science fiction Westerns
Television shows set in Houston
Television series by Universal Television